Richard Petruška (born January 25, 1969) is a Slovak-Italian former professional basketball player and coach. He was born in Levice, Czechoslovakia. At a height of 6'10" (2.08 m) tall, and a weight of 260 lbs. (118 kg), he played at the power forward and center positions.

College career
Petruška played college basketball at Loyola Marymount, and UCLA, in the United States.

Professional career
Petruška was selected by the Houston Rockets, of the National Basketball Association (NBA), with the 46th overall pick (2nd round), of the 1993 NBA draft. He played in 22 games with the Rockets during the 1993–94 NBA season, and scored 53 total points. His only NBA season also saw him as part of an NBA championship team, which resulted in him accidentally dropping and denting the team's first Larry O'Brien Championship Trophy during the celebration of the title. The dent in the trophy's basketball would remain a part of the trophy until 2018, when the team commissioned replacements after an ownership change.

National team career
Petruška was a member of the senior Czechoslovakian national basketball team. He played with the Czechoslovakia at the 1991 EuroBasket.

Coaching career
After he retired from playing professional basketball, Petruška became a basketball coach. He has worked as a coach at the CBA (Canarias Basketball Academy).

Personal life
Petruška lives in Canada with his wife and two sons.

References

External links
 Petruska bio from basketball-reference.com
 Euroleague.net Profile
 FIBA Profile
 FIBA Europe Profile
 Italian League Profile 
 Spanish League Profile 
 TBLStat.net Profile

1969 births
Living people
Baloncesto Málaga players
Basket Zaragoza players
Centers (basketball)
Czechoslovak men's basketball players
Galatasaray S.K. (men's basketball) players
Houston Rockets draft picks
Houston Rockets players
Italian men's basketball players
Lega Basket Serie A players
Liga ACB players
Loyola Marymount Lions men's basketball players
Orlandina Basket players
Pallacanestro Varese players
People from Levice
Sportspeople from the Nitra Region
Power forwards (basketball)
Saski Baskonia players
Slovak expatriate basketball people in Spain
Slovak expatriate basketball people in the United States
Slovak men's basketball players
UCLA Bruins men's basketball players